Jon Clark is a TV personality.

Jon Clark may also refer to:

Jon Clark (field hockey), represented United States at the 1996 Summer Olympics
Jon Clark (lighting designer), see 2015 Laurence Olivier Awards
Jon Clark (rugby league), played in 1972 Manly-Warringah Sea Eagles season
Jon Clark (American football), American football offensive tackle
Jon Clark (NASA), see NASA's Story
Jon Clark (basketball), played in 2007–08 BC Mures season
Jon Clark (editor), of the UK tabloid newspaper Daily Star

See also
Jonathan Clark (disambiguation)
John Clark (disambiguation)